Conchaspis is a genus of true bugs belonging to the family Conchaspididae.

The species of this genus are found in Central America and Southern Africa.

Species:

Conchaspis acaciae 
Conchaspis angraeci 
Conchaspis buchananiae 
Conchaspis capensis 
Conchaspis cordiae 
Conchaspis didiereae 
Conchaspis diplothemii 
Conchaspis ekebergiae 
Conchaspis euphorbiae 
Conchaspis fluminensis 
Conchaspis garciniae 
Conchaspis hainanensis 
Conchaspis insolitus 
Conchaspis lata 
Conchaspis lepagei 
Conchaspis madagascariensis 
Conchaspis mameti 
Conchaspis newsteadi 
Conchaspis orchidarum 
Conchaspis pauliani 
Conchaspis socialis 
Conchaspis tsaratananae 
Conchaspis tsinjoarivensis 
Conchaspis vaccinii 
Conchaspis vaughani 
Conchaspis vayssierei

References

Conchaspididae